Pionerskaya Pravda (Пионе́рская Пра́вда) is an all-Russian newspaper. Initially it was an all-Union newspaper of the Soviet Union. Its name may be translated as "Truth for Young Pioneers".

History 
The newspaper was founded March 6, 1925 in Moscow and published under the name School Pravda and later under Pioneer Truth. Nikolai Bukharin was the first editor of the newspaper. Different poets and artists, like Mikhail Zoshchenko, Ilya Ilf, Evgeny Petrov and Vladimir Mayakovsky, cooperated with the newspaper. On March 6, 1927, the newspaper became part of the Central and Moscow Committees of the All-Union Young Communist League. From 1958, it formed part of the Central Committee of the All-Union Young Communist League and the Central Council of the All-Union Pioneers' Organization. From February 4, 1928 a newspaper was published twice a week, and since October 3, 1928 it has been published three times a week.

The newspaper became a weekly printed body of the Moscow RKSM Committee. In the 1970s and 1980s its circulation approached 10,000,000 (almost every child in the Soviet Union had a subscription). Its title followed the name of the main Soviet newspaper of the time, Pravda, as did multiple other newspapers. In 1991, following the collapse of the USSR, the newspaper was reorganized and became a national newspaper for children and adolescents.

The newspaper continues to exist, but now it is not associated with Young Pioneers, and the circulation is greatly reduced.

Chief editors 

 М. Stremyakov (1925-1926)
 В. Lyadova (1927-1930)
 Н. Lyalin (1931)
 Г. Soldiers (1932-1933)
 А. Stroyev (1933)
 А. Gusev (1934-1935)
 А. Stroyev (1935-1938)
 Н. Danilov (1938-1940)
 И. Andreev (1940-1945)
 В. Gubarev (1945-1947)
 В. Semyonov (1947-1949)
 З. Tumanova (1949-1952)
 С. Potemkin (1952-1953)
 Т. Matveeva (1953-1961)
 Н. Chernova (1961-1982)
 О. I. Grekova (1983-2006)
 М. Barannikov (since 2006)

Awards and recognitions 
In 1995 Pionerskaya Pravda was awarded the Red Banner of Labor, in 1950 the Order of Lenin and in 1985 the Order of Friendship of Peoples.

Other Pioneer Newspapers

Similar newspapers were published in other languages of the USSR: as of 1974, six newspapers in Russian and 22 in other languages.

See also
Eastern Bloc information dissemination

References

External links
 The official site of Pionerskaya Pravda (in Russian)
"Pionerskaya Pravda" digital archives in "Newspapers on the web and beyond", the digital resource of the National Library of Russia

Newspapers published in the Soviet Union
Newspapers published in Russia
Eastern Bloc mass media
Publications established in 1925
Russian-language newspapers
Magazines published in the Soviet Union
Vladimir Lenin All-Union Pioneer Organization
1925 establishments in the Soviet Union
Newspapers published in Moscow